The pygmy longbill or pygmy honeyeater (Oedistoma pygmaeum) is a species of bird in the family Melanocharitidae. It is one of two species in the genus Oedistoma, which also includes the spectacled longbill. It is found in New Guinea and adjacent islands. Its natural habitats are subtropical or tropical dry forest and subtropical or tropical moist lowland forest.

References

pygmy longbill
Birds of New Guinea
pygmy longbill
Taxonomy articles created by Polbot
Endemic fauna of New Guinea